Syoyka (Sooy) is a rural locality (a selo) in Choyskoye Rural Settlement of Choysky District, the Altai Republic, Russia. The population was 1,520 as of 2016. There are 16 streets.

Geography 
Syoyka is located on the Seyka River, 27 km southeast of Choya (the district's administrative centre) by road. Ynyrga is the nearest rural locality.

References 

Rural localities in Choysky District